Jeremy Cheyne (born July 10, 1980) is a Canadian retired professional athlete that is credited for being one of few Canadian born athletes to play both professional ice hockey and lacrosse.

Athletics

Lacrosse
In 2004, Cheyne signed a one-year contract with the Calgary Roughnecks Professional Lacrosse Club of the National Lacrosse League. In 2005, he re-signed for an additional two-year contract1. In 2006, he was moved to the active playing roster.3 A lower body injury led to his eventual retirement following the 2006 campaign. On April 16, 2006, playing in his first NLL game versus the Colorado Mammoth, Cheyne collected 2 goals in a 17-7 loss14.

In 2006, Cheyne signed with the Victoria Shamrocks of the Western Lacrosse Association.

In 2015, Cheyne's minor lacrosse jersey was retired by the Calgary Axemen Lacrosse Club13 in a ceremony held at the Canada Day Lacrosse Tournament on June 28, 2015.

Hockey

In 2001, Cheyne led the Alberta Junior Hockey League (AJHL) in scoring with 128 points (60 G, 68 A, 131 PIM) in 62 games7. In the same year, Cheyne was selected to the AJHL All-League Team representing the North First Team8 as a member of the Fort McMurray Oil Barons. In addition, Cheyne was awarded the Ernie Love Trophy as the AJHL's Top Scorer and finished 2nd in scoring in the Canadian Junior Hockey League9.

In 2001, Cheyne received an athletic scholarship from Western Michigan University10 that played Division 1 hockey in the Central Collegiate Hockey Association (CCHA). Cheyne was awarded the Peter R. Ellis Academic Award11 in both 2003 and 2004 for academic excellence and maintaining the highest Grade Point Average, 3.94, in the WMU Broncos hockey program. On January 30, 2003, Cheyne was selected as the CCHA Offensive Player of the Week12.

In 2004, Cheyne signed a one-year contract2 with the Victoria Salmonkings of the ECHL.

Reality Television
In the summer of 2004, Cheyne competed in a reality show entitled Making the Cut. The hockey themed show was aired on CBC Television in the fall of 2004 and showcased the top 68 Canadian professional hockey players not currently in the NHL. The show was filmed in Vernon, British Columbia and included the coaching of Scotty Bowman and Mike Keenan.5

References

 2005 Transactions. Calgary Roughnecks. [cited October 24, 2005]
 Our Sports Central. [cited October 20, 2004]. 11
 Ty Pilson Calgary Sun. [cited April 21, 2006]
 NLL.com. [cited April 20, 2006]. 38
 Paris Cosby. Reality News. [cited October 7, 2010]. 16
 HockeyDB.com
 Bronco hockey announces 2001 recruiting class. WMU Broncos.
 Hockey Team Awards. WMU Broncos.

External links

1980 births
Canadian ice hockey forwards
Canadian lacrosse players
Living people
Participants in Canadian reality television series
Sportspeople from Calgary
Ice hockey people from Calgary